Minneapolis Golf Club is a golf club located in St. Louis Park, Minnesota, a suburb of Minneapolis, Minnesota. Designed by Willie Park, Jr. and Donald Ross, the Minneapolis golf course opened in 1916. The club hosted the U.S. Amateur in 1950 as well as the PGA Championship in 1959, which Bob Rosburg won.

Club history
In 1916, there were only two golf clubs in Minneapolis, Minikahda Country Club and Interlachen Country Club In early 1916, five members of the Minneapolis Athletic Club set plans to establish another golf club to meet the growing popularity of the game. By July, the Minneapolis Golf Club ("MGC") was incorporated. Land was acquired and nine holes were built on the site of present-day Golden Valley Country Club The opening of play at MGC commenced on the first Saturday of August 1916. Later that year, the club was approached by Hyland Homes Company to consider the purchase of a larger piece of intact farmland in St. Louis Park. The Scottish architect Willie Park Jr. had been retained to lay out the golf course. On December 9, 1916, the MGC membership voted to relocate to the present location. By June 19, 1917, MGC had become one of the earliest member clubs of the Minnesota Golf Association.

By 1918, MGC had 400 members and there was a regular shuttle service to and from the Minneapolis Athletic Club operating during the golf season. In September 1919, plans were initiated to build a new clubhouse to accommodate the now larger membership. The original clubhouse was a converted four-room farmhouse located near the present third tee. The new clubhouse was to be built on the northern section of the property. It opened on May 12, 1923. The rolling farmland our course was built on was virtually void of trees except for a stand of oaks in the northern section by today's 10th and 11th holes. The trees that line the fairways today were planted during a tree-planting program in 1930.

Course architects

Two Scots, Willie Park, Jr. (1864–1925) of Musselburgh and Donald J. Ross (1872–1948) of Dornoch, at different times designed and routed the golf course. On November 26, 1916, The Minneapolis Tribune wrote, "Willie Park, well known golf course architect, arrived yesterday to lay out the course of the Minneapolis Golf Club". Discovered field notes of the original land survey firm show that Park routed the course in early December 1916. Ross' involvement is demonstrated thorough a routing plan of the course executed by Donald J. Ross Associates, Inc. in 1920 that was found by the Chair of the History Committee of the Donald Ross Society in 2011. The two routings are framed and displayed within the clubhouse.  In 2019, golf architect Jeff Mingay led a restoration of the golf course design in conjunction with construction specialist Duininck Golf.

Golf events

MGC has a great golfing tradition. It developed in part due to the quality design of the golf course. By the mid-1920s, MGC was growing in local and national recognition. In 1940, after Sam Snead played an exhibition match at MGC, he said that he "hoped that (MGC) would some day host a U.S. Open". The most prestigious amateur event was the Golden Anniversary (50th) U.S. Amateur in 1950. As result of holding the 1959 PGA Championship at MGC, the club is in elite company as one of only 120 golf clubs in the world to have hosted a Grand Slam event (Masters, U.S. Open, British Open, and PGA) since 1860.

Championships
National professional events:
PGA Championship (1) 1959
Dayton's Challenge (6) 1995, 1996, 1997, 1998, 1999, 2000

National amateur events:
U.S. Amateur (1) 1950
Western Amateur (1) 1940

Minnesota amateur events:
MGA Junior Championship (1) 1924
MGA Senior Championship (2) 1962, 1975
MGA 4-Ball Championship (1) 1976
MGA Amateur Championship (5) 1925, 1936, 1953, 1988, 2007
MGA Senior 4-Ball Championship (3) 1971, 1982, 1990
MWGA Match Play Championships (7) 1924, 1931, 1951, 1958, 1968, 1978, 1990

Minnesota professional events:
Minnesota State Open (6) 1924, 1927, 1932, 1944, 1957, 1975
Minnesota Section PGA (1) 1971
Minnesota Golf Champions (26) 1975–2000

References

External links
Official site
Photos of golf course after bunker and tee box restoration

Golf clubs and courses in Minnesota
Golf clubs and courses designed by Donald Ross
Buildings and structures in Hennepin County, Minnesota
Sports venues completed in 1916
1916 establishments in Minnesota